Upper Class Recordings is a Canadian independent record label founded in 2000 in Toronto, Ontario.  The electronic music-based Upper Class roster includes The Russian Futurists, Cadence Weapon, DVAS, Christien Summers and The Cansecos.

History
Upper Class Records was born at the turn of the millennium; its first album release was the debut LP by The Russian Futurists - The Method Of Modern Love.  Since 2000, Upper Class formalized as Upper Class Recordings and has released four albums by The Russian Futurists, two albums each by The Cansecos and Cadence Weapon and single albums by girlsareshort (Al-P from MSTRKRFT) and Food For Animals.  UC Artists became known for making albums in their bedrooms and ending up not just in the underground music media. but into the mainstream eyes of massive publications like The New York Times and The Guardian.

In 2006 Upper Class began a distribution partnership with EMI Music Canada

In 2010, Nettwerk One Music, the publishing arm of Vancouver's Nettwerk Music Group, announced that it is representing the publishing works of Upper Class Recordings worldwide.

In 2016, Kobalt Music Publishing began representing Upper Class Recordings worldwide.

The Upper Class label has become synonymous with the unique and exciting Canadian electronic music sound revolution.  Lost At Sea Magazine describes, "Canadian label Upper Class has struck gold. Its roster seems to produce blissed-out electronic pop masterpieces like an assembly line"

Upper Class Recordings, through licensing partnerships, has seen its releases picked up by Anti-/Epitaph Records, Ninja Tune/Big Dada Recordings, Memphis Industries, and Cooperative Music.

Discography 
 UC001 - Various Artists - The Manhattan Collection
 UC002 - The Russian Futurists - Ecole de Neige EP
 UC003 - The Russian Futurists - The Method of Modern Love
 UC004 - The Russian Futurists - Let's Get Ready to Crumble
 UC005 - The Cansecos - The Cansecos
 UC006 - Girlsareshort - Early North American
 UC007 - Various Artists - We Owe You Nothing
 UC008 - Food For Animals - Scavengers
 UC009 - The Russian Futurists - Our Thickness
 UC010 - Cadence Weapon - Breaking Kayfabe
 UC011 - The Russian Futurists - Me, Myself and Rye
 UC012 - The Cansecos - Juices!
 UC013 - Cadence Weapon - Afterparty Babies
 UC014 - DVAS - Society
 UC015 - The Russian Futurists - The Weight's on the Wheels
 UC016 - Cadence Weapon - Hope In Dirt City
 UC020 - The Russian Futurists - Reality Burger with a side of life EP

References

External links 
 Upper Class Recordings

Canadian independent record labels
Indie pop record labels
Record labels established in 2000
Companies based in Toronto